Mary Ann Lisanti (born October 27, 1967) is an American politician and a member of the Democratic Party, who represented District 34A in the Maryland House of Delegates. Previously she represented district F on the Harford County Council, representing Havre de Grace, Abingdon, Belcamp/Riverside and Aberdeen Proving Ground.  In January 2014 Lisanti filed to run for the Maryland House of Delegates and to not seek a 3rd term on the County Council. In early March 2019, the House of Delegates unanimously censured Lisanti for a racial slur directed at the African-American majority Prince George's County, with her own county's Democratic Party calling for her resignation.

Political career

2014 Maryland State Delegate candidacy
Lisanti entered the race for Delegate in district 34A after much speculation that she might run for the seat left open when Delegate Mary-Dulany James decided to run for Maryland State Senate.  On June 24, 2014 Lisanti led the Democratic primary by nearly 10 percentage points, with Marla Posey-Moss coming in second, after a heavily contested race with five candidates vying for two seats.  Lisanti and Posey-Moss faced Republicans Glen Glass and Mike Blizzard in the General election in November. Glass and Lisanti finished 1 and 2, thus gaining election.

Censure
On February 26, 2019, The Washington Post reported that Lisanti referred to Prince George's County, Maryland as a "n----- district" [thus in the original] in conversation with another Democratic legislator.  She was removed as the chair of a subcommittee. Two days later she was unanimously censured by the House of Delegates in a 136-0 vote, but refused to resign her seat. On March 2, 2019, the Harford County Democratic Central Committee called for Lisanti to resign for using the racial slur.

2022 Maryland State Senate candidacy
On January 28, 2022, Lisanti entered the race for State Senate in District 34, seeking to succeed Senator Robert G. Cassilly, who announced his candidacy for Harford County executive in April 2021. Lisanti lost the Democratic primary to Mary-Dulany James.

Election results
2006 Primary Election Results Harford County Council – District F
Voters to choose one:
{| class="wikitable"
!Name
!Votes
!Percent
!Outcome
|-
|-
|Mary Ann Lisanti, Dem.
|1,898
|  64.6%
|   Won
|-
|-
|Gunther Hirsch, Dem.
|1,057
|  35.8%
|   Lost
|}

2006 General Election Results Harford County Council – District F
Voters to choose one:
{| class="wikitable"
!Name
!Votes
!Percent
!Outcome
|-
|-
|Mary Ann Lisnati, Dem.
|7,433
|  60.3%
|   Won
|-
|-
|John P. Correri, Jr., Rep.
|4,877
|  39.6%
|   Lost
|-
|Write-Ins
|13
|  0.1%
|   Lost
|}

2010 General Election Results Harford County Council – District F
Voters to choose one:
{| class="wikitable"
!Name
!Votes
!Percent
!Outcome
|-
|-
|Mary Ann Lisanti, Dem.
|7,167
|  51.8%
|   Won
|-
|-
|Sheryl Davis Kohl, Rep.
|6,646
|  48.1%
|   Lost
|-
|Write-Ins
|16
|  0.1%
|   Lost
|}

2014 Primary Election Results Maryland House of Delegates - District 34A - Harford County
Voters to choose two:
{| class="wikitable"
!Name
!Votes
!Percent
!Outcome
|-
|-
|Mary Ann Lisanti, Dem.
|2,473
|  29.0%
|   Won
|-
|-
|Marla Posey-Moss, Dem.
|1,895
|  22.2%
|   Won
|-
|-
|Pat Murray., Dem.
|1,784
|  20.9%
|   Lost
|-
|-
|Steve Johnson, Dem.
|1,574
|  18.4%
|   Lost
|-
|-
|Maria Terry, Dem.
|812
|  9.5%
|   Lost
|}

2014 General Election Results Maryland House of Delegates – District 34A - Harford County

Voters to choose two:
{| class="wikitable"
!Name
!Votes
!Percent
!Outcome
|-
|-
|Glen Glass, Rep.
|10,779
|  28.41%
|   Won
|-
|-
|Mary Ann Lisanti, Dem.
|10,015
|  26.40%
|   Won
|-
|-
|Mike Blizzard, Rep.
|9,041
|  23.83%
|   Lost
|-
|-
|Marla Posey-Moss, Dem.
|8,057
|  21.24%
|   Lost
|-
|Write-Ins
|49
|  0.13%
|   Lost
|}

2018 Primary Election Results Maryland House of Delegates - District 34A - Harford County

Voters to choose two:
{| class="wikitable"
!Name 
!Votes
!Percent
!Outcome
|-
|- 
|Mary Ann Lisanti, Dem
|3,794
|  46.8%
|   Won
|-
|- 
|Steve Johnson, Dem
|2,190
|  27.0%
|   Won
|-
|-
|- 
|Sarahia Benn, Dem                
|2,123
|26.2%
|   Lost
|}

References

External links
Legislative homepage
Campaign website
Facebook page

1967 births
Living people
Women state legislators in Maryland
Maryland Democrats
People from Havre de Grace, Maryland
21st-century American politicians
21st-century American women politicians
Notre Dame of Maryland University alumni
Central Michigan University alumni
County commissioners in Maryland